Mountain Cry is a 2015 Chinese drama film directed by Larry Yang. The film is based on the novel of the same title by Ge Shuiping.

Synopsis
Set in a remote village, the story begins with the sudden death of a husband and father whose family is new to the village's tight-knit traditional community. In the aftermath of that tragic event, the villagers come to know and understand the man's widow, a mysterious mute with a story to tell and the power to tell it wordlessly.

Cast
Lang Yueting as Hong Xia
Wang Ziyi as Han Chong
Cheng Taishen
Yu Ailei as La Hong
Guo Jin
Xu Caigen as Qi Liu
Zhao Chendong
Li Siying

Production
Production started in early October 2014 and principal photography will take place in Shanxi.

Release
The film was the closing film at the 20th Busan International Film Festival.

Reception

Critical response
Justin Chang of Variety called the film a "forceful small-town melodrama [that] offers a sweeping indictment of human vindictiveness."

References

External links

2015 drama films
2015 films
Chinese drama films
Films based on Chinese novels
Films shot in Shanxi
Films set in the 1980s
Films directed by Larry Yang